The City Road Cemetery is a cemetery in the City of Sheffield, England that opened in May 1881 and was originally Intake Road Cemetery. Covering  it is the largest
and is the head office for all the municipally owned cemeteries in Sheffield.  The cemetery contains Sheffield Crematorium, whose first cremation was on 24 April 1905.

Location
The cemetery is located to the east of central Sheffield. It is in the district called Manor, on a gentle hillside. The cemetery is mainly bordered by housing, on the north, east and south faces, and by City Road on the west. On City Road is the main entrance which features Grade II listed gatehouse which houses the reception and halls of remembrance.

War graves
There are 220 burials or commemorations of Commonwealth servicemen at the cemetery who died in the First World War. A Screen Wall memorial in Section Q, near the main entrance, lists those buried in graves that could not be individually marked by headstones.

There are 147 burials or commemorations of servicemen and women who died in the Second World War, many in a war graves plot in Section H.  The plot has a Screen Wall memorial listing servicemen buried in the defunct Sheffield General Cemetery and St Phillip Ward End Church Cemetery whose graves could no longer be maintained by the Commonwealth War Graves Commission.  The Commission also erected a memorial, on the west side of the plot, listing 30 servicemen who were cremated at Sheffield Crematorium during the same war and it cares for 9 war graves of foreign nationalities, of which the Belgians have a focal War Memorial in the cemetery.

Also buried in the cemetery are civilian victims of air raids, the largest group (134 who died in the Sheffield Blitz of December 1940) being buried in a communal grave with memorial.

Notable buildings and structures
 The Gatehouse, Grade II listed
 The Crematorium and chapel, Grade II listed
 The Catholic Chapel, Grade II listed
 The Harwich Road gate and gatehouse, Grade II listed
 Belgian War Memorial, Grade II listed
 The Blitz grave, Grade II listed
 War Memorial by Sir R Blomfield, Grade II listed

Notable burials or cremations
 Reverend Arthur Herbert Procter (1890–1973), First World War Victoria Cross recipient, was cremated here – ashes buried at Sheffield Cathedral.
 Thomas Worsley Staniforth (1845–1909), hymn writer.

References

External links

 

City
Commonwealth War Graves Commission cemeteries in England